Perälä is a Finnish surname. Notable people with the surname include:

 Helge Perälä (1915–2010), Finnish long-distance runner
 Juho Perälä (1887–1938), Finnish farmer and politician
 Kirsi Perälä (born 1982), Finnish cross-country skier

Finnish-language surnames